Chandur bazar is a City governed by a Municipal Council in Amravati district  in the state of Maharashtra, India.

Demographics 
 India census, Chandurbazar had a population of 18759. Males constitute 51% of the population and females 49%. Chandurbazar has an average literacy rate of 79%, higher than the national average of 59.5%; with male literacy of 83% and female literacy of 75%. 13% of the population is under 6 years of age.

Chandurbazar has large organizations like Rashtriya Swayamsevak Sangh, Bharatiya janta party and Akhil Bhartiya Vidhyarthi Parishad Vishwa Hindu Parishad, Bajrang Dal.

Economy
Chandurbazar is a hub for buying and selling cattle in the nearby region. It is also famous for jaggery processed by local farmers. The region also produces oranges and custard apples. It is also famous for saint Gulabrao Maharaj. Well known as Gudaacha Chandur.

Education
There are four senior colleges in Chandurbazar:

  Dr. Panjabrao Deshmukh Yoga Mahavidyalay College
(Near Bhaktidham, Chandur Bazar- Borala Road.)
 N.A. Deshmukh College                                  
 G. S. Tompe Arts, Commerce & Science College
 College of Home Science
The G. S. Tompe Arts, Commerce & Science College was established in 1968 by Govidrao Sitaram Tompe to provide higher education in Chandurbazar. 

Schools from the primary to the secondary level of education include:
 Dnyanodaya Vidyamandir Bhaktidham
 Jijamata High School
 G. R. Kabra High School
 Nagar Parishad High School
 Mainabai High School
 Urdu High School
 Orange Line School
 Jagadamb High School
 Anand Primary School
 Maharashtra Primary School

There are several kindergartens in Chandurbazar, including the following:
 Nirmitee Convent
 Sunrise Convent
 Little Angels School
 G. R. Kabra Public Convent
 I-Tech Computer Institute, Shivaji Nagar, Chandur Bazar

Communication 
Chandurbazar is linked by road to the city of Amravati, as well as neighboring towns like Morshi, Paratwada (Achalpur) Asegaon, etc. The proposed Nagpur-Indore National Highway will go through the town. Chandurbazar is also connected by rail, with one train station on the Amravati-Narkher line.

References 

Cities and towns in Amravati district
Talukas in Maharashtra